Tetraphlorethol C is a phlorethol-type phlorotannin found in the brown alga Ascophyllum nodosum.
chemically, it is a tetramer of 1,2,3,5-Tetrahydroxybenzene

References 

Phlorotannins
Natural phenol tetramers